Zieria aspalathoides, commonly known as the whorled zieria, heath zieria, hairy zieria or heathy zieria, is a plant in the citrus family Rutaceae and is endemic to eastern Australia. It is a heath-like shrub with leaves that appear to be whorled and with pink flowers in groups of three, each with four petals and four stamens.

Description
The edges of the leaflets are rolled under and the upper surface is a darker green than the lower one.

The flowers are pale to deep pink and are arranged in groups of mostly three, the groups usually longer than the leaves. Flowering occurs from late winter to early summer and is followed by the fruit which is a mostly glabrous follicle containing black seeds.

Taxonomy and naming
Zieria aspalathoides was first formally described in 1863 by George Bentham from an unpublished description by Allan Cunningham. Bentham's description was published in Flora Australiensis. The specific epithet (aspalathoides) refers to a perceived similarity to plants in the genus Aspalathus - the suffix -oides means "likeness" in Latin.

Two subspecies have been described:

Distribution and habitat
This zieria occurs in Queensland, New South Wales and Victoria, growing in dry forest heath, usually in sandy soil and often between rocks. Subspecies aspalathoides is widespread from Victoria to the Atherton Tableland in Queensland, although it only occurs in a few scattered populations in Victoria. In New South Wales it occurs on the tablelands and western slopes. Subspecies brachyphylla only occurs on the Blackdown Tableland in Queensland.

References

External links
 
 Images of ''Z. aspalathoides

aspalathoides
Sapindales of Australia
Flora of New South Wales
Flora of Queensland
Flora of Victoria (Australia)
Plants described in 1863